Among Other Things, I’ve Taken Up Smoking is a novel by Aoibheann Sweeney, published in 2007 by Penguin Press. A girl grows up alone with her father on an island in Maine and is sent to stay in New York City with gay friends of her father's who open up her past, and her own world, in ways she cannot begin to imagine. The book was an Editor's Choice at the New York Times Book Review. It also won a Lambda Literary Award in the Lesbian Debut Fiction category at the 2008 Lambda Literary Awards.

In a review in The Washington Post, Ron Charles wrote about the way the book “taps into older, sometimes ancient stories...There’s real wisdom in these classic myths and there’s real talent in this sensitive novel.”

References

External links 
 Among Other Things, I've Taken Up Smoking in The New York Times Sunday Book Review
 Among Other Things, I've Taken Up Smoking at the Penguin Press

2007 American novels
2000s LGBT novels
American LGBT novels

Novels set in New York City
Novels set in Maine
Lambda Literary Award-winning works
Penguin Press books

2007 LGBT-related literary works